Vladimír Kameš (born December 10, 1983) is a Czech professional ice hockey defenceman. He played with HC Kladno in the Czech Extraliga during the 2010–11 Czech Extraliga season.

References

External links

1983 births
Czech ice hockey defencemen
Rytíři Kladno players
Living people